Sibley is a village in Jackson County, Missouri, United States. The population was 314 at the 2020 census. It is known as the home of Fort Osage National Historic Landmark. It is part of the Kansas City metropolitan area.

History
Sibley was platted in 1836. The village was named for George C. Sibley, the first Indian agent and postmaster of Fort Osage. A post office called Sibley has been in operation since 1842.

Geography
Sibley is located at  (39.180338, -94.195940).

Demographics

2010 census
As of the census of 2010, there were 357 people, 129 households, and 98 families living in the village. The racial makeup of the village was 96.4% White, 0.8% Native American, and 2.8% from two or more races. Hispanic or Latino of any race were 3.9% of the population.

There were 129 households, of which 37.2% had children under the age of 18 living with them, 61.2% were married couples living together, 8.5% had a female householder with no husband present, 6.2% had a male householder with no wife present, and 24.0% were non-families. 19.4% of all households were made up of individuals, and 10.1% had someone living alone who was 65 years of age or older. The average household size was 2.77 and the average family size was 3.14.

The median age in the village was 40.1 years. 24.4% of residents were under the age of 18; 9.8% were between the ages of 18 and 24; 23.1% were from 25 to 44; 25.5% were from 45 to 64; and 17.4% were 65 years of age or older. The gender makeup of the village was 49.6% male and 50.4% female.

2000 census
As of the census of 2000, there were 347 people, 128 households, and 94 families living in the village. The population density was 332.9 people per square mile (128.8/km). There were 133 housing units at an average density of 127.6 per square mile (49.4/km). The racial makeup of the village was 95.97% White, 1.44% African American, 1.15% Native American, 0.29% Asian, 0.86% from other races, and 0.29% from two or more races. Hispanic or Latino of any race were 3.17% of the population.

There were 128 households, out of which 37.5% had children under the age of 18 living with them, 70.3% were married couples living together, 2.3% had a female householder with no husband present, and 25.8% were non-families. 20.3% of all households were made up of individuals, and 9.4% had someone living alone who was 65 years of age or older. The average household size was 2.71 and the average family size was 3.18.

In the village, the population was spread out, with 25.9% under the age of 18, 8.4% from 18 to 24, 28.8% from 25 to 44, 23.9% from 45 to 64, and 13.0% who were 65 years of age or older. The median age was 37 years. For every 100 females, there were 112.9 males. For every 100 females age 18 and over, there were 97.7 males.

The median income for a household in the village was $45,000, and the median income for a family was $50,417. Males had a median income of $40,313 versus $28,125 for females. The per capita income for the village was $17,100. About 2.1% of families and 5.4% of the population were below the poverty line, including 2.2% of those under age 18 and 16.7% of those age 65 or over.

References

Villages in Jackson County, Missouri
Missouri populated places on the Missouri River
Villages in Missouri